The Tokyo Tapes is a live and studio album by English guitarist Steve Hackett, released in April 1998 by Camino Records. It documents two concerts performed by a supergroup line-up of Hackett, John Wetton, Chester Thompson, Ian McDonald and Julian Colbeck, in Tokyo, Japan in December 1996. The album includes two studio tracks recorded by Hackett. In 2001, a same-titled DVD of the concerts was released.

Background
The DVD contains 18 minutes of bonus rehearsal footage and band biographies.

Both the CD and the DVD were promoted with the tagline: "What would it sound like if occasional members of GENESIS, KING CRIMSON, ASIA, YES, ZAPPA & WEATHER REPORT all got together to form a unique team just for one night?"

A Triple-LP package pressed on White Vinyl was released for Record Store Day on June 18, 2022

Track listing
Original artists for live songs are listed in brackets.

Disc 1
 "Watcher of the Skies" (Banks, Rutherford, Hackett, Gabriel, Collins) – 8:59 [Genesis]
 "Riding the Colossus" (Hackett) – 3:32 [Solo Steve Hackett]
 "Firth of Fifth" (Banks, Collins, Hackett, Rutherford, Gabriel) – 9:32 [Genesis]
 "Battlelines" (Wetton, Marlette, Mitchell) – 6:43 [Solo John Wetton]
 "Camino Royale" (Hackett, Magnus) – 9:06 [Solo Steve Hackett]
 "The Court of the Crimson King" (McDonald, Sinfield) – 7:39 [King Crimson]
 "Horizons" (Hackett) – 1:53 [Genesis/Solo Steve Hackett]
 "Walking Away from Rainbows" (Hackett) – 3:47 [Solo Steve Hackett]
 "Heat of the Moment" (Wetton, Downes) – 4:06 [Asia]

Disc 2
 "...In That Quiet Earth'" (Hackett, Rutherford, Banks, Collins) – 4:02 [Genesis]
 "Vampyre With a Healthy Appetite" (Hackett) – 7:23 [Solo Steve Hackett]
 "I Talk to the Wind" (McDonald, Sinfield) – 5:37 [King Crimson]
 "Shadow of the Hierophant" (Hackett, Rutherford) – 7:14 [Solo Steve Hackett]
 "Los Endos" (Banks, Collins, Rutherford, Hackett) – 6:54 [Genesis]
 "Black Light" (Hackett) – 2:30 [Solo Steve Hackett]
 "The Steppes" (Hackett) – 6:48 [Solo Steve Hackett]
 "I Know What I Like" (Hackett, Banks, Rutherford, Collins, Gabriel) – 5:51 [Genesis]
 "Firewall" (Hackett) [Studio Track] – 4:41
 "The Dealer" (Hackett) [Studio track] – 4:23
 "Los Endos" (Hackett) ['Revisited' Studio Version] 8:52

RSD 2022 Track listing
Original artists for live songs are listed in brackets.

LP 1, Side 1
 "Watcher of the Skies" (Banks, Rutherford, Hackett, Gabriel, Collins) – 8:59 [Genesis]
 "Riding the Colossus" (Hackett) – 3:32 [Solo Steve Hackett]
 "Firth of Fifth" (Banks, Collins, Hackett, Rutherford, Gabriel) – 9:32 [Genesis]

LP 1, Side 2
 "Battlelines" (Wetton, Marlette, Mitchell) – 6:43 [Solo John Wetton]
 "Camino Royale" (Hackett, Magnus) – 9:06 [Solo Steve Hackett]
 "The Court of the Crimson King" (McDonald, Sinfield) – 7:39 [King Crimson]

LP 2, Side 3
 "Horizons" (Hackett) – 1:53 [Genesis/Solo Steve Hackett]
 "Walking Away from Rainbows" (Hackett) – 3:47 [Solo Steve Hackett]
 "Heat of the Moment" (Wetton, Downes) – 4:06 [Asia]
 "...In That Quiet Earth'" (Hackett, Rutherford, Banks, Collins) – 4:02 [Genesis]
 "Vampyre With a Healthy Appetite" (Hackett) – 7:23 [Solo Steve Hackett]

LP 2, Side 4
 "I Talk to the Wind" (McDonald, Sinfield) – 5:37 [King Crimson]
 "Shadow of the Hierophant" (Hackett, Rutherford) – 7:14 [Solo Steve Hackett]
 "Los Endos" (Banks, Collins, Rutherford, Hackett) – 6:54 [Genesis]

LP 3, Side 5
 "Black Light" (Hackett) – 2:30 [Solo Steve Hackett]
 "The Steppes" (Hackett) – 6:48 [Solo Steve Hackett]
 "I Know What I Like" (Hackett, Banks, Rutherford, Collins, Gabriel) – 5:51 [Genesis]

LP 3, Side 6
 "Firewall" (Hackett) [Studio Track] – 4:41
 "The Dealer" (Hackett) [Studio track] – 4:23
 "Los Endos" (Hackett) ['Revisited' Studio Version] 8:52

Credits (live tracks)
 Steve Hackett – guitar, harmonica, vocals
 Ian McDonald – flute, saxophone, guitar, keyboards, vocals
 Julian Colbeck – keyboards, vocals
 John Wetton – bass, guitar, vocals
 Chester Thompson – drums

Credits (studio tracks)
 Steve Hackett – guitar, percussion
 Aron Friedman – keyboards, programming

References

Steve Hackett albums
1999 live albums